Patterson Township is one of thirteen townships in Greene County, Illinois, USA.  As of the 2010 census, its population was 636 and it contained 282 housing units.

Geography

Cities, towns, villages
 Hillview
 Wilmington

Unincorporated towns
 Grand Pass at 
 Hanks Station at 
 McClay Orchard at 
 Patterson at 
(This list is based on USGS data and may include former settlements.)

Cemeteries
The township contains these eight cemeteries: Bluefield, Hanks, Johnson Burial Ground, Pinetree, Rawlins, Shelton, Smith and Wilmington.

Airports and landing strips
 Hartwell Ranch RLA Airport

Rivers
 Illinois River

Demographics

School districts
 North Greene Unit School District 3

Political districts
 Illinois's 17th congressional district
 State House District 97
 State Senate District 49

References

External links
 City-Data.com
 Illinois State Archives
 
 United States Census Bureau 2007 TIGER/Line Shapefiles
 United States National Atlas

Townships in Greene County, Illinois
Townships in Illinois